Heteroscodra is a genus of Central African tarantulas that was first described by Reginald Innes Pocock in 1900. Like many Old World tarantulas, they have a strong venom, and can inflict a painful bite.  it contains two species, found in Africa: H. crassipes and H. maculata.

See also
 List of Theraphosidae species

References

External links

Theraphosidae genera
Spiders of Africa
Taxa named by R. I. Pocock
Theraphosidae